Marshall Airport may refer to:

 Baltimore/Washington International Thurgood Marshall Airport in Baltimore, Maryland, United States (FAA: BWI)
 Marshall Don Hunter Sr. Airport in Marshall, Alaska, United States (FAA: MDM, IATA:MLL)
 Marshall Memorial Municipal Airport in Marshall, Missouri, United States (FAA: MHL)		

Airports in places named Marshall:
 Brooks Field (Michigan) in Marshall, Michigan, USA (FAA: RMY)
 Harrison County Airport (Texas) in Marshall, Texas, United States (FAA: ASL)
 Searcy County Airport in Marshall, Arkansas, United States (FAA: 4A5)
 Southwest Minnesota Regional Airport, also known as Marshall/Ryan Field, in Marshall, Minnesota, United States (FAA: MML)

See also 
 Marshall County Airport (disambiguation)